Auerbach and Averbuch and Aberbach is a German surname, commonly Jewish, derived from a toponym meaning meadow-brook. Another variant is Aberbach. Sometimes it is modified to Auerbacher, meaning someone coming from a town or village called Auerbach. Notable people with this surname include the following:

Abraham Auerbach (died 1846), German rabbi
 (1926-2008),  Israeli rabbi
 (born 1935), Israeli rabbi
Alan J. Auerbach (born 1951), American economist
 (born 1988), German handball player
 (1844-1916), Russian mining engineer, industrialist, creator and organizer of production, scientist
 (1873-1954), German actor and writer
Arnold Auerbach (disambiguation), multiple people
Arnold M. Auerbach (1912–1998), American screenwriter
Artie Auerbach (1903–1957), American comedian, press photographer
Auerbach (Jewish family), a family of scholars in the 16th to 19th centuries
 (1793-1864), German-Jewish educator
Beatrice Fox Auerbach (1887–1968), philanthropist, president and director of G. Fox & Co. from 1938 to 1959
Ben Auerbach (1919–1993), American professional basketball player
 (1855-1940), German physician
Benjamin Hirsch Auerbach (1808–1872), German rabbi and one of the most prominent leaders of modern Orthodox Judaism
Berthold Auerbach (1812–1882), German-Jewish poet and author
 (1839-?), Polish rabbi
Chaim Yehuda Leib Auerbach (1883-1954), Israeli rabbi
Charlotte Auerbach (1899–1994), German-Jewish geneticist
 (born 1970), American composer and music educator
 (1900-1997), German musicologist and author
Dan Auerbach (born 1979), American guitarist and vocalist for The Black Keys
Dathan Auerbach, author of the novel Penpal
David Auerbach, American writer with a background in software engineering
Doron Aurbach (born 1952), Israeli electrochemist, materials and surface scientist
 (1914-2003),  Israeli military man and businessman
 (1912-1995), Soviet actress of theater and cinema, pop, writer
Ella Auerbach, (1900-1999), one of the first female German lawyers
Ellen Auerbach (1906–2004), German-born American photographer
Erich Auerbach (photographer) (1911–1977), Czech-Jewish photographer
 (1892-1973), Yiddish writer, poet, editor and translator
Erich Auerbach (1892–1957), German-born American scholar of literature
Ezriel Auerbach (born 1937), prominent Haredi rabbi and posek
Felix Auerbach (1856–1933), German physicist
Frank Auerbach (born 1931), German-born British painter
Friedrich Auerbach (1870–1925), German chemist. He was the son of anatomist Leopold Auerbach and the brother of physicist Felix Auerbach. He was the father of geneticist Charlotte Auerbach
Gary Auerbach, American television and film writer, director and producer
, German football player
Heinrich Auerbach (ex. Heinrich Stromer) (1482–1542), physician and senator of Leipzig
Herbert S. Auerbach (1882–1945), prominent Jewish businessman in Salt Lake City and also a member of the Utah House of Representatives
Herman Auerbach (1901–1942), Polish mathematician
Ilya Auerbach (also known as Ilya Averbakh), Russian Jewish film maker often known by the Russianized version of the name
Inge Auerbacher (born 1934), German-American chemist and Holocaust survivor with essentially the same name (meaning "someone from a meadow brook")
 (1827-1875), German architect
Isaac L. Auerbach (1921–1992), early advocate and pioneer of computing technologies, holder of 15 patents, founding president of the International Federation for Information Processing (1960–1965), a member of the National Academy of Science, an executive at the Burroughs Corporation and a developer of first computers at Sperry Univac
 (1877-1951),  Israeli rabbi
 (1846-?), Polish rabbi
 (1815-1867),  Russian geologist and mineralogist, professor
Jake Auerbach (born 1958), British film maker specialising in documentary subjects. Though his films have ranged across the cultural spectrum he is best known for his portraits of artists both contemporary and historical
Jerold Auerbach, American historian and professor emeritus of history at Wellesley College
 (1922-2002), Israeli writer in the English 
Johann Gottfried Auerbach (1697–1753), Austrian painter and etcher
Johann Karl Auerbach (1723–1780s), Austrian painter
Joseph Danziger Auerbach, Yiddish writer
Larry Auerbach (1923-2014), American television director and National Vice President of the Directors Guild of America
 (born 1933), German politician
Leopold Auerbach (1828–1897), German physician
 (1847-1925), German jurist and historian
Lera Auerbach (born 1973), Soviet-Russian-born American classical composer and pianist
Lisa Anne Auerbach (born 1967), American artist
 (1840-1882), German merchant, jeweler and poet
Marian Auerbach (1882–1941), also known as Majer Auerbach (1882–1941), Polish classical philologist of Jewish background
Max Auerbach (1879–1968), German zoologist known for his research of Cnidospora
Meir Auerbach, first Ashkenazi Chief Rabbi of Jerusalem
 (1858-1930), Rabbi in the Land of Israel
Menahem Mendel Auerbach (1620–1689), Austrian rabbi, banker, and commentator born in Vienna at the beginning of the 17th century
Neil Auerbach (born 1958), private equity investor known for his leadership role in clean energy investment
 (1892-1930), Soviet scientist, archaeologist, local historian, public figure
Oscar Auerbach (1905–1997), Jewish-American pathologist
Paul Auerbach (1951–2021), American physician and author in the discipline, wilderness medicine
 (1906-1952), Head of the Bavarian State Compensation Office
Red Auerbach (1917–2006), Boston Celtics coach and founder of the Red Auerbach Basketball School
Rick Auerbach (born 1950), American baseball player
Rokhl Auerbakh (1903–1976), Polish-Israeli writer, essayist, historian, and Holocaust scholar
Shlomo Zalman Auerbach (1910-1995), Orthodox Jewish rabbi, posek, and rosh yeshiva of the Kol Torah yeshiva in Jerusalem, Israel
Shona Auerbach, British film director and cinematographer
 (1866-1923), German neurologist
Sol Auerbach (1906–1986), American Communist historian better known as James S. Allen
Solomon Heymann Auerbach (died 1836), Hebrew scholar and translator
Stephen Auerbach, Santa Monica, California based American filmmaker best known for two documentary films that aired on A+E Networks in 2015: "The Secret Tapes of the O.J. Case," and "O.J. Speaks: The Lost Deposition Tapes."
Stevanne Auerbach (born 1938), also known as Dr. Toy, American educator, child development expert, and writer
Tauba Auerbach (born 1981), visual artist working across many disciplines including painting, artists' books, photography, and sculpture, lives and works in New York
Taylor Auerbach (born 1991), Australian journalist who rose to prominence after becoming the youngest ever winner of the Australian Millionaire Hot Seat game show, a spinoff version of Who Wants to Be a Millionaire?
 (born 1947), Civil rights activist in the GDR and until 2009 employee of the Federal Commissioner for Stasi documents
 (1905-1975), German social-democratic politician and resistance fighter against Nazism 
Wilfried Auerbach (1960), Austrian rower
Willi Auerbach (born 1980), German illusionist, magician
Yael Averbuch (born 1986), American soccer player
Yuri Averbakh (born 1922), Russian chess grandmaster with the Russianized form of the name

A prominent family of rabbis in Jerusalem, including:
Shlomo Zalman Auerbach (1910–1995), renowned Orthodox Jewish rabbi, posek, and rosh yeshiva of the Kol Torah yeshiva in Jerusalem, Israel. The Jerusalem neighborhood Ramat Shlomo is named after Rabbi Auerbach
Chaim Yehuda Leib Auerbach
Shmuel Auerbach (1931-2018), prominent Haredi rabbi in Jerusalem, Israel
Ezriel Auerbach (or Azriel Auerbach) (born 1937), prominent Haredi rabbi and posek. He is the son of Rabbi Shlomo Zalman Auerbach, and son-in-law of Rabbi Yosef Shalom Elyashiv, two renowned poskim. He was considered Rabbi Elyashiv's right-hand man in matters of halakha

References

German-language surnames
Jewish surnames
Yiddish-language surnames